Chemical finishing of textiles refers to the process of applying and treating textiles with a variety of chemicals in order to achieve desired functional and aesthetic properties. Chemical finishing of textiles is a part of the textile finishing process where the emphasis is on chemical substances instead of mechanical finishing. Chemical finishing in textiles also known as wet finishing. Chemical finishing adds properties to the treated textiles. Softening of textiles, durable water repellancy and wrinkle free fabric finishes are examples of chemical finishing.

Finish 
Textile finishing is the process of converting the loom state or raw goods into a useful product, which can be done mechanically or chemically. Finishing is a broad term that refers to a variety of physical and chemical techniques and treatments that finish one stage of textile production while also preparing for the next. Textile finishing can include aspects like improving surface feel, aesthetic enhancement, and adding advanced chemical finishes. A finish is any process that transforms unfinished products into finished products. This includes mechanical finishing and chemical applications which alter the composition of treated textiles (fiber, yarn or fabric.)

Mechanical finishes 
Mechanical finish refers to machine finishes such as embossing, heat setting, Sanforizing, shearing, luster imparting, surface finishes, and glaze finishes.

Chemical finishes 
Chemical finishes are chemicals that may alter the properties of the treated fabrics. Finishes may vary from aesthetic to special purposes. Examples of chemical finishes are:

 Fabric softeners impart soft hand feel to the treated fabrics.
 Silk surfacing a surface finishing of cotton to obtain an appearance similar to silk.
 Plissé is chemical finish in which the fabrics are treated with sodium hydroxide to obtain a puckering effect.
 Deweighting, or weight reduction, is a treatment for polyester to make it like silk. The treatment peels the surface and reduces the fiber weight and strength while making them softer and finer. Additionally, the treatment enhances the absorbency of the treated substrates.

Purpose 
Finishing makes the textiles attractive and more useful. The finishing process adds essential properties to the treated textiles and enhances the serviceability of the products.

Serviceability in textiles includes aesthetics, comfort, durability, care and protection attributes.

Performance chemical finishes 
"Special purpose finishes" or ''performance finishes'' improve the performance of textiles for a specific end-use. Performance finishes are not a new concept; oilcloth is the first known coated fabric. Boiled linseed oil is used to make oilcloth. Boiled oils have been used from the year 200 AD. Performance finishing contributes to a variety of areas.  The following are some examples of special-purpose finishes: 
 Flame retardant finishes based on inorganic, organophosphorus, halogenated organic and nitrogen-based compounds make the treated fabric fire retarding; i.e., the fabric inhibits or suppresses the combustion process to improve safety.
Durable water repellent finishes provide water repellancy to the treated fabrics.
 Wrinkle-resistant fabrics are treated fabrics with wrinkle-free finishes.
In manufacturing of  pristine clothes.
Self cleaning fabrics with lotus effect.
Medical textiles are endowed with protecting properties such as body fluid resistance and an antimicrobial surface for use in personal protective equipment including aprons, coverall and gowns for healthcare workers treating infectious diseases such as COVID-19.
Coated fabrics are used for transportation, industrial application, geotextile, and military use.

Application 
Chemical finishes can be applied in three different ways: exhaust applications, coating, and padding.

Exhaust 
Exhaust application is carried out by immersion the substrate in the chemical solution.

Padding 
In padding applications, the material comes in contact with chemicals on a padding mangle. The material is then dried or cured using a stenter.

Coating 
The coating is an application of chemical substances on the surface of fabric that is to be made functional or decorative. Coating is attained by applying a thin layer of a functional chemical, compound, or polymer on the substrate's surface. Coatings use less material than other types of applications, such as exhaust or padding.

Nanomaterials 
Advances in chemical finishes include application of nanomaterials.

Chemical hazards 
Certain chemical finishes contain potential hazards to health and the environment. Perfluorinated acids are considered to be hazardous to human health by the US Environmental Protection Agency.

See also 

 Wet process engineering
 Performance (textiles)

References 

Textiles
Textile techniques
Textile chemistry
Textile treatments